Fahy-lès-Autrey is a commune (municipality) in the Haute-Saône department in the region of Bourgogne-Franche-Comté in eastern France. It lies immediately to the west of Auvet-et-la-Chapelotte and due north of Autrey-lès-Gray.

Population

See also
Communes of the Haute-Saône department

References

Communes of Haute-Saône